Wideo Wabbit is a 1956 Warner Bros. Looney Tunes cartoon directed by Robert McKimson. The short was released on October 27, 1956, and stars Bugs Bunny and Elmer Fudd. In the film, Bugs volunteers for an appearance in a television show hosted by Elmer. He is unaware that this is a show about hunting techniques, and he volunteered to become a hunter's prey.

Plot
Bugs Bunny is singing "This Is My Lucky Day" when he comes on an ad in the newspaper wanting a rabbit for a show at the QTTV-TV studio. When he gets there, the producer makes Bugs climb a ladder wired to a 10,000-volt fuse box. Unbeknownst to Bugs, it is a hunting show starring Elmer Fudd called The Sportsman's Hour, sponsored by The French Fried Fresh Frozen Rabbit Company. He teaches the audience about how to hunt a rabbit. He signals the cue for Bugs to come up out of the hole by pushing a button to activate the fuse box. When Bugs emerges, Elmer starts shooting. Bugs will not cooperate being shot at and Bugs takes this as professional jealousy, but on a scale he had never imagined. As Bugs leaves the studio with Elmer in pursuit, the producer frantically holds up a sign to the camera that says "Program Temporarily Interrupted. Please Stand By."

Elmer chases Bugs all over the studio. In the first room, Bugs does a show called You Beat Your Wife (a parody of You Bet Your Life) and Bugs dressed as Groucho Marx contests Elmer. As Bugs walks off, Elmer sees Bugs in disguise and Bugs kisses him. In the next room Elmer gets a cherry pie in his face for the show You're Asking For It (a parody of You Asked for It). In the following room Bugs plays "Liver-ace" (a parody of Liberace), and when Elmer comes in, he is playing the piano. When Bugs sees Elmer, he shows piano keys like teeth, calls Elmer "his brother George", and tells Elmer to take the candelabra over to Mother. The candles are actually sticks of dynamite that blows up Elmer enough to wreck his clothes. Bugs quoted as Liver-ace "I did it because I wanted my show to go off with a bang"!

While chasing Bugs out of the studio and looking for him, Elmer asks Bugs (who is dressed as a studio usher) if he has seen a rabbit go by. Bugs sends Elmer into a studio that was filming You Were There (a parody of You Are There) which was reenacting Custer's Last Stand. As Elmer comes out having been attack by Indians, Bugs redirects Elmer to Studio C for The Medic. Elmer says "Oh, much obliged" as he is leaving with a tomahawk in the back of his head and three arrows in his back.

Elmer continues his search for Bugs stating that unless he finds "that wabbit", his career will be ruined. Finally, Bugs appears dressed as a producer and brings Elmer into a show called Fancy Dress Party (a parody of The Arthur Murray Dance Party), Elmer gets changed into a rabbit costume, and Bugs gets into Elmer's hunting outfit.

Bugs goes back on The Sportsman's Hour and shoots Elmer in his rabbit suit as Elmer gets angry. Bugs then comes in dressed as Ed Norton from The Honeymooners and gives Elmer a cigar with Groucho Marx's glasses and eyebrows while quoting "Hey, hey, hey! Take it easy. Have a cigar. Geez, what a Groucho"!

Production details
That is the second time that Bugs has played Groucho Marx to avoid Elmer. The first time was Friz Freleng's cartoon Slick Hare (1947), but Elmer comes much closer to catching Bugs in that Groucho scene than in the one in Wideo Wabbit, by means of disguise as Groucho's brother Harpo.

When Bugs is masquerading as Liberace and playing the piano, the part where he gets his fingers tied in a knot was reused animation from another Freleng cartoon, Rhapsody Rabbit (1946).

When Elmer is tracking Bugs' footprints while giving tips, music is reused from A Wild Hare where Bugs taps on Elmer's head and introduces his catch phrase. McKimson (who directed this cartoon) animated A Wild Hare without receiving screen credit.

The call letters for the TV station in the cartoon, "QTTV", is lifted from KTTV, a local television station in Los Angeles.

The exterior of the QTTV studio bears more than a passing resemblance to that of the CBS Television City complex.

This is the final Bugs Bunny cartoon which uses the Carl Stalling melody What's Up, Doc? over the title cards.

Butler would later use the Ed Norton voice for Yogi Bear.

In the mid-1990s, whenever Cartoon Network would have technical difficulties interrupts a broadcast, in lieu of a slide showing the channel logo/name, sometimes a screenshot of the producer holding the "Program Temporarily Interrupted - Please Stand By" sign up to the TV camera from this cartoon would be used (More commonly, the Cartoon Network station identification slide was also used with characters from various Hanna-Barbera/MGM in a blue checkerboard background as it’s more common screenshot during technical difficulties). For unknown reasons at one point, whenever one episode of The New Scooby-Doo Mysteries is about to end a shot of that scene is shown for 1 second. The concept was used until between 1999 and 2000 when it was replaced by a still photo of a Cartoon Network station identification logo in a background of an Arizona typed desert.

The producer is a caricature of comedian Frank Nelson, best known for his recurring role on The Jack Benny Program and his drawn-out way of saying "Yeeeeeeeeessss?"

Home media
Wideo Wabbit is available, uncut and restored, on Looney Tunes Golden Collection: Volume 3, Disc 2.

See also
 People Are Bunny - A later cartoon that featured another You Are There parody.

References

External links

1956 films
1956 animated films
1956 short films
Merrie Melodies short films
Warner Bros. Cartoons animated short films
Films scored by Carl Stalling
Films directed by Robert McKimson
Cultural depictions of the Marx Brothers
Cultural depictions of Liberace
1950s parody films
Bugs Bunny films
Elmer Fudd films
1956 comedy films
1950s Warner Bros. animated short films
Films produced by Edward Selzer
Films about hunters
Films about television
1950s English-language films